Eugenio Santoro (27 August 1920 – 13 May 2006), was an Italian-born Swiss outsider artist.

Biography
Born at Castelmezzano, in the province of Potenza (Basilicata), he started as a carpenter but he had to quit his job going to the front during World War II . He fought in Albania and Greece but got arrested and deported to Germany, where he was sentenced to hard labor in the Rhineland for two years.

Santoro was released in 1944 and returned to his native town working as a municipal employee and then as an owner of a small woodworking shop. In 1964, due to financial difficulties, he moved to Switzerland with his wife, finding employment as a laborer at the chocolate factory "Camille Bloch" in Courtelary.

His passion for art began in 1979, representing a painting of the factory; then he came to sculpture. His works are mostly wooden sculptures depicting human and animal figures. Among his works are worth mentioning Mary Magdalene (1984) and The Egyptienne (1989). The first exhibition of his sculptures was held in 1986 at the "Espace Noir" of Saint-Imier, chaired by Maurice Born.

Three years later, Born presented him to Michel Thévoz, curator of the Collection de l'art brut in Lausanne, who organized a permanent exhibition of his works. In 2004, a second exhibition was organized in the same place. Santoro died at Courtelary in 2006.

Bibliography
Lucienne Peiry, Art brut: the origins of outsider art, Flammarion, 2001
Michel Thévoz, Collection de l'art brut, Lausanne, Institut suisse pour l'étude de l'art, 2001

See also 
List of Outsider artists

External links

Biography of Eugenio Santoro

1920 births
2006 deaths
People from Castelmezzano
Italian expatriates in Switzerland
20th-century Italian painters
Italian male painters
21st-century Italian painters
Outsider artists
20th-century sculptors
20th-century Italian male artists
21st-century Italian male artists